Vingis Park Rugby Stadium is a rugby union stadium in Vilnius, Lithuania. It is located in Vingis Park, next to the city's main athletics stadium,  .

In 2014 the stadium hosted the 2014 European Women's Sevens Championship Division B.

References 

Rugby union stadiums in Lithuania
Sports venues in Vilnius